Sambou Sissoko (born 27 April 1999) is a French professional footballer who plays as a right-back for Belgian club Seraing.

Club career
Sissoko made his professional debut with Tours in a 1–0 Ligue 2 loss to Stade de Reims on 11 August 2017.

In January 2019, he signed a four-year contract with Reims. He was loaned to Quevilly-Rouen for the 2020–21 season on 16 October 2020.

On 30 June 2022, Sissoko moved to Seraing in Belgium on a two-year deal.

International career
Born in France, Sissoko is of Malian descent. Sissoko is a youth international for France at the U19 level.

References

External links

 
 
 
 
 

1999 births
Living people
People from Clamart
French footballers
France youth international footballers
Association football defenders
Tours FC players
Stade de Reims players
US Quevilly-Rouen Métropole players
R.F.C. Seraing (1922) players
Ligue 1 players
Ligue 2 players
Championnat National players
Championnat National 2 players
Championnat National 3 players
French people of Malian descent
Footballers from Hauts-de-Seine
French expatriate footballers
Expatriate footballers in Belgium
French expatriate sportspeople in Belgium